Sravanthi Juluri is an Indian visual artist, painter and actress, known for executing vibrantly colored spiritual narrative paintings, and glass art in a modified style; as well as television. She is the daughter of veteran Telugu actress Jamuna. Sravanthi was trained at Stained Glass Garden Studio and Mountain View academy in Berkeley, California, U.S.

Personal life
Sravanthi Juluri was born in Hyderabad, India into the family of veteran Telugu actress Jamuna. She did her schooling from NASR, and Intermediate from Villa Marie in Hyderabad. Sravanthi holds Bachelor of Arts from B. R. Ambedkar University. She performed as a child artist in television series “Veera Satrajit”, and “Dr. Mamatha” for Doordarshan. She is married to Rahul Reddy in 2009,  the couple have a Son Avish. The couple divorced in 2012.

References

1980 births

Living people
Indian portrait painters
21st-century Indian painters
Indian painters
Telugu people
Indian women artists
Indian women painters
Indian child actresses
Painters from Andhra Pradesh
Painters from Telangana
21st-century Indian artists